The Washington-Alexandria Architecture Center (WAAC), is an extension center of Virginia Tech's College of Architecture and Urban Studies, located in Old Town Alexandria. It houses the Master of Architecture, Master of Landscape Architecture, and Undergraduate Architecture programs for students from a wide variety of locations. Sited on an urban campus of six buildings in the heart of Old Town, WAAC allows upper-level undergraduate and graduate students in architecture, landscape architecture, and urban design to address the complexities of urban areas using the Washington, D.C. metropolitan region as a resource laboratory for design and research. The center also encompasses a consortium of architecture schools from around the globe.

Overview
The WAAC has operated as the urban extension of Virginia Tech's College of Architecture and Urban Studies in the Washington metropolitan area since 1980.

See also
Virginia Tech
Virginia Tech College of Architecture and Urban Studies

References

Virginia Tech